Ahmed al-Ghazzal or, in full, Abu l-Abbas Ahmed ibn Al-Mahdi al-Ghazzal al-Andalusi al-Maliqi (died in Fes, 1777) was the secretary of the Moroccan Sultan Mohammed ibn Abdallah (1757–89). Al-Ghazzal is the author of a rihla about his journey to Spain called Natidjat al-iditihad fi l-muhadana wa l-djihad and of a biography of the head of the Isawa religious order, Al-Nur al-Khamil (Mohammed Ben Aissa).

References

Moroccan biographers
Moroccan travel writers
1777 deaths
People from Fez, Morocco
18th-century Moroccan people
Moroccan civil servants
Year of birth unknown
Ambassadors of Morocco to Spain
Moroccan diplomats
Moroccan scholars
18th-century Moroccan poets